The Ayodhya dispute is a political, historical, and socio-religious debate in India, centred on a plot of land in the city of Ayodhya, Uttar Pradesh. The issues revolve around the control of a site traditionally regarded among Hindus to be the birthplace of their deity Rama, the history and location of the Babri Masjid mosque at the site, and whether a previous Hindu temple was demolished or modified to create the mosque.

The Babri Masjid was destroyed during a political rally on 6 December 1992 triggering riots all over the Indian subcontinent. Many attempts were thwarted previously, one of which led to the 1990 Ayodhya firing incident. A subsequent land title case was lodged in the Allahabad High Court, the verdict of which was pronounced on 30 September 2010. While the three-judge bench was not unanimous that the disputed structure was constructed after demolition of a temple, it did agree that a temple structure predated the mosque at the same site.

The five-judge Supreme Court bench heard the title dispute cases from August to October 2019. On 9 November 2019, the Supreme Court, headed by Chief Justice Ranjan Gogoi, announced their verdict; it vacated the previous decision and ruled that the land belonged to the government based on tax records. It further ordered the land to be handed over to a trust to build the Hindu temple. It also ordered the government to give an alternate five-acre tract of land to the Uttar Pradesh Sunni Central Waqf Board to build the mosque. 

The Archaeological Survey of India  during excavation of the site had found remains of a temple there which was later used as evidence in the Supreme Court of India.

On 5 February 2020, the Government of India made an announcement for a trust named as Shri Ram Janmabhoomi Teerth Kshetra to reconstruct a Ram temple there. It also allocated an alternative site in Dhannipur, Ayodhya to build a mosque to replace the Babri Masjid that was demolished in 1992.

Religious background
The land on which the medieval mosque, Babri Masjid, stood is traditionally considered by Hindus to be the birthplace of the Hindu deity, Rama, and is at the core of the Ayodhya dispute.

Ram Janmabhoomi (Rama's birthplace)

Rama is one of the most widely worshipped Hindu deities and is considered the seventh incarnation of god Vishnu. According to the Ramayana, Rama was a prince born in Ayodhya to parents Kaushalya and Dasharatha in the Treta Yuga, that is thousands of years before the Kali Yuga which is supposed to have begun in 3102 BCE according to the Hindu tradition.

The Ayodhya Mahatmya, described as a "pilgrimage manual" of Ayodhya, traced the growth of the sect in the second millennium CE. The original recension of the text, dated to the period between 11th and 14th centuries, mentions the janmasthana (birthplace) as a pilgrimage site. A later recension adds many more places in Ayodhya and the entire fortified town, labelled Ramadurga ("Rama's fort"), as pilgrimage sites.

Babri Masjid (Mosque of Babur)

Babur was the first Mughal emperor of India and the founder of the Mughal empire. It is believed that one of his generals, Mir Baqi, built the Babri Masjid ("Babur's Mosque") in 1528 on his orders. The belief came into currency since 1813–14, when the East India Company's surveyor Francis Buchanan reported that he found an inscription on the mosque walls which attested to this fact. He also recorded the local tradition, which believed that emperor Aurangzeb built the mosque after demolishing a temple dedicated to Rama.

Between 1528 and 1668, no text mentioned the presence of a mosque at the site.
The earliest historical record of a mosque comes from Jai Singh II, a Rajput noble in the Mughal court, who purchased the land of the mosque and the surrounding area in 1717. His documents show a three-domed structure resembling the mosque, which is however labelled the "birthplace" (chhathi). In the courtyard can be seen a platform (chabutra) to which Hindu devotees are shown circumambulating and worshipping. All these details were corroborated by the Jesuit priest Joseph Tieffenthaler half a century later. Tieffenthaler also said that "The reason for this is that once upon a time, here was a house where Beschan [Vishnu] was born in the form of Ram."

The Baburnama, Babur's diary in which he meticulously documented his life, bears no mention of either the construction of a mosque in Ayodhya or the destruction of a temple for it. Neither do his grandson Akbar's court documents, the Ain-i-Akbari, nor his contemporary Hindu poet-saint Tulsidas' epic poem Ramcharitmanas, dedicated to the Hindu god Rama.

Both the Hindus and Muslims are said to have worshipped at the "mosque-temple", Muslims inside the mosque and Hindus outside the mosque but inside the compound. In 1857 a British administrator had a railing erected between the two areas to prevent disputes. In 1949, after India's independence, an idol of Ram was placed inside the mosque, which triggered the dispute.

Historical background

Gupta period 
In Buddha's time (600 BCE) the present-day Ayodhya was called Saketa and it was one of the 6 largest cities of North India.  During the Gupta times, either Kumaragupta or Skandagupta made it their capital, after which it came to be called Ayodhya. Kalidasa wrote Raghuvamsa here, and referred to Gopratara tirtha (Guptar Ghat), where Rama was believed to have entered the waters of Saryu in his ascent to heaven. According to a local tradition recorded by Francis Buchanan and Alexander Cunningham, Ayodhya became desolate after Rama's ascent to heaven and "Vikramaditya" revived it. (In Raghuvamsa, Rama's son Kusa revived it.) Prabhavatigupta, the daughter of Chandragupta II, was a Rama devotee. Her son, Pravarasena II wrote Sethubandha, in which Rama is regarded as identical to Vishnu. He also built a temple to Rama at Pravarapura (Paunar near Ramtek) in about 450 CE.

Gahadavala period 

After the Guptas, the capital of North India moved to Kannauj and Ayodhya fell into relative neglect. It was revived by the Gahadavalas, coming to power in the 11th century CE. The Gahadavalas were Vaishnavas. They built several Vishnu temples in Ayodhya, five of which survived till Aurangzeb's reign. Indologist Hans T. Bakker concludes that there might have been a temple at the supposed birth spot of Rama built by the Gahadavalas. In subsequent years, the cult of Rama developed within Vaishnavism, with Rama being regarded as the foremost avatar of Vishnu. Consequently, Ayodhya's importance as a pilgrimage centre grew. In particular, multiple versions of Ayodhya Mahatmya (magical powers of Ayodhya) prescribed the celebration of Ram Navami (the birthday of Rama).

Mughal period 

In modern times, a mosque was located at the supposed birth spot of Rama, which sat on a large mound in the centre of Ayodhya, called the Ramadurg or Ramkot (the fort of Rama). The mosque bore an inscription stating that it was built in 1528 by Mir Baqi on the orders of Babur.

According to an early 20th century text by Maulvi Abdul Ghaffar and the surrounding historical sources examined by historian Harsh Narain,
the young Babur came from Kabul to Awadh (Ayodhya) in disguise, dressed as a Qalandar (Sufi ascetic), probably as part of a fact-finding mission.  Here he met the Sufi saints Shah Jalal and Sayyid Musa Ashiqan and took a pledge in return for their blessings for conquering Hindustan. The pledge is not spelled out in the 1981 edition of Abdul Ghaffar's book, but it is made clear that it is in pursuance of this pledge that he got the Babri mosque constructed after conquering Hindustan. The original book was written in Persian by Maulvi Abdul Karim, a spiritual descendant of Musa Ashiqan, and it was translated into Urdu by Abdul Ghaffar, his grandson, with additional commentary. The older editions of Abdul Ghaffar's book contain more detail, which seems to have been excised in the 1981 edition.

Lala Sita Ram of Ayodhya, who had access to the older edition in 1932, wrote, "The faqirs answered that they would bless him if he promised to build a mosque after demolishing the Janmasthan temple.  Babur accepted the faqirs' offer and returned to his homeland."

The fact that Babur came in the guise of a Qalandar is corroborated in Abdullah's Tarikh-i Dawudi, where it is detailed that he met the Sultan Sikandar Lodhi in Delhi in the same disguise. The inscription on the Babri mosque also names him as Babur Qalandar. Musa Ashiqan's grave is situated close to the Babri mosque site, whose shrine uses two of the same type of black basalt columns used in the Babri mosque, indicative of his role in the destruction of the prior temple.

Tulsidas, who began writing the Ramcharit Manas in Ayodhya on Rama's birthday in 1574 (coming there from his normal residence in Varanasi) mentioned the "great birthday festival" in Ayodhya but made no mention of a mosque at Rama's birthplace. Abu'l-Fazl ibn Mubarak (1551–1602), who wrote Akbarnama, completing the third volume Ain-i Akbari in 1598, described the birthday festival in Ayodhya, the "residence of Rama" and the "holiest place of antiquity", but made no mention of a mosque. William Finch, the English traveller who visited Ayodhya around 1611, and wrote about the "ruins of the Ranichand [Ramachand] castle and houses" where Hindus believed the great God "took flesh upon him to see the tamasha of the world." He found pandas (Brahmin priests) in the ruins of the fort, who were recording the names of the pilgrims, a practice that was said to go back to antiquity. Again there was no mention of a mosque in his account.

Late Mughal period 
The first known report of a mosque appears in a book Sahifa-I-Chihil Nasaih Bahadur Shahi, said to have been written by a daughter of the emperor Bahadur Shah I (1643–1712) and granddaughter of emperor Aurangzeb, in the early 18th century. It mentioned mosques having been constructed after demolishing the "temples of the idolatrous Hindus situated at Mathura, Banaras and Awadh etc." Hindus are said to have called these demolished temples in Awadh "Sita Rasoi" (Sita's kitchen) and "Hanuman's abode". While there was no mention of Babur in this account, the Ayodhya mosque had been juxtaposed with those built by Aurangzeb at Mathura and Banaras.

Jai Singh II (popularly called "Sawai Jai Singh", 1688–1743) purchased land and established Jaisinghpuras in all Hindu religious centres in North India, including Mathura, Vrindavan, Banaras, Allahabad, Ujjain and Ayodhya. The documents of these activities have been preserved in the Kapad-Dwar collection in the City Palace Museum in Jaipur. R. Nath, who has examined these records, concludes that Jai Singh had acquired the land of Rama Janmasthan in 1717. The ownership of the land was vested in the deity. The hereditary title of the ownership was recognized and enforced by the Mughal State from 1717. He also found a letter from a gumastha Trilokchand, dated 1723, stating that, while under the Muslim administration people had been prevented from taking a ritual bath in the Saryu river, the establishment of the Jaisinghpura has removed all impediments.

The Jesuit priest Joseph Tieffenthaler, who visited Awadh in 1766–1771, wrote, "Emperor Aurangzebe got the fortress called Ramcot demolished and got a Muslim temple, with triple domes, constructed at the same place. Others say that it was constructed by 'Babor'. Fourteen black stone pillars of 5 span high, which had existed at the site of the fortress, are seen there. Twelve of these pillars now support the interior arcades of the mosque." This ambiguity between Aurangzeb and Babur could be significant. Tieffenthaler also wrote that Hindus worshipped a square box raised 5 inches above the ground, which was said to be called the "Bedi, i.e., the cradle", and "The reason for this is that once upon a time, here was a house where Beschan [Vishnu] was born in the form of Ram." He recorded that Rama's birthday was celebrated every year, with a big gathering of people, which was "so famous in the entire India".

Beginnings of dispute 
The first recorded instances of religious violence in Ayodhya occurred in the 1855. Certain "Sunnis claimed that the Bairagis of Hanumangarhi had destroyed a mosque that existed atop it. The Muslims charged on the Hanumangarhi but were repelled and routed. They hid inside the mosque of Babur that lay at a distance of less than a kilometre from Hanumangarhi." The Babri mosque was attacked by Hindus in the process. Since then, local Hindu groups made occasional demands that they should have the possession of the site and that they should be allowed to build a temple on the site, all of which were denied by the colonial government. In 1946, an offshoot of the Hindu Mahasabha called  Akhil Bharatiya Ramayana Mahasabha (ABRM) started an agitation for the possession of the site. In 1949, Sant Digvijay Nath of Gorakhnath Math joined the ABRM and organised a 9-day continuous recitation of Ramcharit Manas, at the end of which the Hindu activists broke into the mosque and placed idols of Rama and Sita inside. People were led to believe that the idols had 'miraculously' appeared inside the mosque. The date of the event was 22 December 1949.

Jawaharlal Nehru insisted that the idols should be removed. However, the local official K. K. K. Nair, known for his Hindu nationalist connections, refused to carry out orders, claiming that it would lead to communal riots. The police locked the gates so that the public (Hindus as well as Muslims) could not enter.  However, the idols remained inside and priests were allowed entry to perform daily worship. So, the mosque had been converted into a de facto temple. Both the Uttar Pradesh Sunni Central Waqf Board and the ABRM filed civil suits in a local court staking their respective claims to the site. The land was declared to be under dispute, and the gates remained locked.

Christophe Jaffrelot has called the Gorakhnath wing of Hindu nationalism 'the other saffron', which has maintained its existence separately from the mainstream Hindu nationalism of the Sangh Parivar. After the Vishva Hindu Parishad was formed in 1964 and started agitating for the Babri Masjid site, the two strands of 'saffron politics' came together.
The district magistrate Nair, who refused to carry out orders, was eventually dismissed, but he became a local hero and subsequently a politician of the Bharatiya Jana Sangh.

Demolition of the Babri Mosque

In the 1980s, the Vishwa Hindu Parishad (VHP), belonging to the mainstream Hindu nationalist family Sangh Parivar, launched a new movement to "reclaim" the site for Hindus and to erect a temple dedicated to the infant Rama (Ramlala) at this spot. The Bharatiya Janata Party (BJP), formed in 1980 from the remnants of the Jana Sangh, became the political face of the campaign. In 1986, a district judge ruled that the gates would be reopened and Hindus permitted to worship inside, providing a major boost to the movement. In September 1990, BJP leader L. K. Advani began a "rath yatra" (pilgrimage procession) to Ayodhya in order to generate support for the movement. Advani later stated in his memoirs, "If Muslims are entitled to an Islamic atmosphere in Mecca, and if Christians are entitled to a Christian atmosphere in the Vatican, why is it wrong for the Hindus to expect a Hindu atmosphere in Ayodhya?" The yatra resulted in communal riots in many cities in its wake, prompting the government of Bihar to arrest Advani. In spite of this, a large number of 'kar sevaks' or Sangh Parivar activists reached Ayodhya and tried to attack the mosque. They were stopped by the Uttar Pradesh police and the paramilitary forces, resulting in a pitched battle in which several kar sevaks were killed. Accusing the central government led by V.P. Singh of being weak, the BJP withdrew its support, necessitating fresh elections. In these elections, the BJP won a majority in the Uttar Pradesh legislative assembly increased its share of seats in the Lok Sabha.

On 6 December 1992, the VHP and its associates, including the BJP, organised a rally involving 150,000 VHP and BJP kar sevaks at the site of the mosque. The ceremonies included speeches by the BJP leaders such as Advani, Murli Manohar Joshi and Uma Bharti. The mob grew restive through the duration of the speeches, and stormed the mosque shortly after noon. A police cordon placed there to protect the mosque was heavily outnumbered. The mosque was attacked with a number of improvised tools, and brought to the ground in a few hours. This occurred despite a commitment from the state government to the Indian Supreme Court that the mosque would not be harmed. More than 2000 people were killed in the riots following the demolition. Riots broke out in many major Indian cities including Mumbai, Bhopal, Delhi and Hyderabad.

On 16 December 1992, the Liberhan Commission was set up by the Government of India to probe the circumstances that led to the demolition of the Babri Mosque. It was the longest running commission in India's history with several extensions granted by various governments. The report found a number of people culpable in the demolition, including BJP leaders like Atal Bihari Vajpayee, Lal Krishna Advani, Murli Manohar Joshi, then Uttar Pradesh chief minister Kalyan Singh, Pramod Mahajan, Uma Bharti and Vijayaraje Scindia, as well as VHP leaders like Giriraj Kishore and Ashok Singhal. Other prominent political leaders indicted by the commission include late Shiv Sena chief Bal Thackeray and former RSS leader K. N. Govindacharya. Relying on the testimonies of several eyewitnesses, the report stated that many of these leaders had made provocative speeches at the rally that provoked the demolition. It also stated that they could have stopped the demolition if they had so wished.

Many Muslim organisations have continued to express outrage at the destruction of the disputed structure. In July 2005, terrorists attacked the makeshift temple at the site of the destroyed mosque. In 2007, M. N. Gopal Das, the then head of the Ram temple, received phone calls making threats against his life. Many terror attacks by banned jihadi outfits like Indian Mujahideen cited the demolition of Babri Mosque as an excuse for terrorist attacks.

Post-independence
Several years later mosques were built in the Faizabad district, in which the pilgrim city of Ayodhya falls. Ayodhya itself has a small Muslim population, though there are substantial numbers of Muslims 7 km away at District Headquarters – Faizabad.
Since 1949, by Indian Government order, Muslims were not permitted to be closer than 200 yards away to the site; the main gate remained locked, though Hindu pilgrims were allowed to enter through a side door.
The 1986 Allahabad High Court ordered the opening of the main gate and restored the site in full to the Hindus. Hindu groups later requested modifications to the Babri Mosque, and drew up plans for a new grand Temple with Government permissions; riots between Hindu and Muslim groups took place as a result, and the dispute became sub-judice. The political, historical and socio-religious debate over the history and location of the Babri Mosque, is known as the Ayodhya dispute.

Excavations

In 2003, by the order of an Indian High Court, the Archaeological Survey of India (ASI) was asked to conduct a more in-depth study and an excavation to ascertain whether the type of structure that was beneath the rubble indicated definite proof of a temple under the mosque. However, it could not be ascertained if it was a Rama temple, as the remnants had more resemblance to a Shiva temple. In the words of ASI researchers, they discovered "distinctive features associated with... temples of north India". Excavations further yielded:

One of the judges of the Allahabad High Court in 2010 criticised the independent experts who had appeared on behalf of the Uttar Pradesh Sunni Central Waqf Board including Suvira Jaiswal, Supriya Verma, Shireen F. Ratnagar and Jaya Menon. The witnesses withered under scrutiny and were discovered to have made "reckless and irresponsible kind of statements". He also pointed out that the independent witnesses were all connected, while adding that their opinions were offered without making a proper investigation, research or study into the subject.

Udit Raj's Buddha Education Foundation claimed that the structure excavated by ASI in 2003 was a Buddhist stupa destroyed during and after the Muslim invasion of India.

The excavations by the ASI were used as evidence by the court that the predating structure was a massive Hindu religious building.

Aligarh Historians Society has criticized both the ASI and the Allahabad High Court Judgement on several grounds. First, Justice Agarwal concluded that inscriptions on the Babri Masjid that attribute the Masjid to Babar are not genuine in favor of an omission in account by Fr. Joseph Tieffenthaler to conclude that Mir Baki does not exist and the mosque was constructed by Aurangzeb instead of Babur. However, omissions of this kind "are hardly every given credence" in history. Moreover, Justice Agarwal wrongly concludes that Mir Baqi is a fictional character because he could not find the person ‘Mir Baqi Isfahani’ or ‘Mir Baqi’ in Babur's Memoirs. Habib et al. (2010) argue that `Baqi Tashkandi` and `Baqi Shagawal` are the same person as `Mir Baqi` on the inscriptions. Similarly, ASI professionalism has been criticized for not tabulating the contrarian evidence like animal bones and glazed pottery in spite of explicit instructions from the courts. ASI has also been criticized for ignoring or selecting loose group of brickbats as pillar bases to support their theory of temple beneath the mosque.

Title cases
In 1950, Gopal Singh Visharad filed a title suit with the Allahabad High Court seeking injunction to offer 'puja' (worship) at the disputed site. A similar suit was filed shortly after but later withdrawn by Paramhans Das of Ayodhya. In 1959, the Nirmohi Akhara, a Hindu religious institution, filed a third title suit seeking direction to hand over the charge of the disputed site, claiming to be its custodian. A fourth suit was filed by the Uttar Pradesh Sunni Central Waqf Board for declaration and possession of the site. The Allahabad high court bench, comprising justices S. U. Khan, Sudhir Agarwal and D. V. Sharma, began hearing the case in April 2002, which it would complete by 2010. In 2003, the Archaeological Survey of India began a court-ordered survey to determine if a temple to Lord Rama existed on the site; the survey said there was evidence of a temple beneath the mosque, but this was disputed by Muslims. After the Supreme Court dismissed a plea to defer the High Court verdict, on 30 September 2010, the High Court of Allahabad, the three-member bench ruled that the disputed land be split into three parts. The site of the Ramlala idol would go to the party representing Ram Lalla Virajman (the installed Infant Ram deity), Nirmohi Akhara to get Sita Rasoi and Ram Chabutara, and the Uttar Pradesh Sunni Central Waqf Board to get the rest. The court also ruled that the status quo should be maintained for three months. All the three parties appealed against the division of disputed land in the Supreme Court.

Supreme Court verdict

The Supreme Court (SC) held final hearing on the case from 6 August 2019 to 16 October 2019. The bench reserved the final judgment and granted three days to contesting parties to file written notes on 'moulding of relief' or narrowing down the issues on which the court is required to adjudicate.

The final judgement in the Supreme Court was declared on 9 November 2019. The Supreme Court ordered the land to be handed over to a trust to build the Hindu temple. It also ordered the government to give an alternate 5 acres of land to the Uttar Pradesh Sunni Central Waqf Board for the purpose of building a mosque. The court has said in its verdict that the Nirmohi Akhara is not a shebait or devotee of the deity Ram Lalla and the Akhara's suit was barred by limitation.

The Supreme Court dismissed all 18 petitions seeking review of the verdict on 12 December 2019.

Timeline

See also

 Communalism (South Asia)
 Conversion of non-Islamic places of worship into mosques
 Ram ke Naam – a documentary on the Ayodhya dispute by Anand Patwardhan
 Temple Mount – similarly disputed location in Jerusalem

Notes

References

Sources

Further reading

 
 Dubashi, Jay (1992). The Road to Ayodhya. Delhi: South Asia Books.
 
  
 Jain, Meenakshi The Battle for Rama: Case of the Temple at Ayodhya (Aryan Books International, 2017), .

External links
 Ayodhya Verdict Live Updates
 Nirmohi Akhara ready for out-of-court settlement – TCN News
 Ram Janmabhoomi Babri Masjid – Ayodhya Bench: Gist of Judgments at Allahabad High Court
 

 
History of Uttar Pradesh (1947–present)
Religious controversies in India